Frank Joseph Sullivan (August 16, 1912 – June 14, 1956) was an American football player. A native of Nashville, Tennessee, he attended Father Ryan High School in Nashville and played college football for Loyola in New Orleans. He was selected as the center on Red Grange's All-America team as a senior. He then played professional football in the National Football League (NFL) for the Chicago Bears from 1935 to 1939 and for the Pittsburgh Steelers in 1940. He appeared in 49 NFL games as a center and linebacker. After retiring from football, Sullivan worked for E.I. duPond de Nemour' nitro-cellulose plant in Indiana. He suffered from diabetes and died in 1956 at age 43 after gall bladder surgery.

References

1912 births
1956 deaths
Chicago Bears players
Pittsburgh Steelers players
Loyola Wolf Pack football players
Players of American football from Tennessee